Ictidopappus ("grandfather of weasels") is an extinct genus of mammals from extinct subfamily Ictidopappinae within extinct family Viverravidae, that lived in North America during the early Paleocene.

Phylogeny
The phylogenetic relationships of genus Ictidopappus are shown in the following cladogram.

See also
 Mammal classification
 Viverravidae

References

Viverravids
Paleocene mammals of North America
Prehistoric placental genera